Decatur Negro High School was a public high school in Decatur, Alabama, United States. It was a segregated school that was established in 1921 and closed in 1966 when the public schools were integrated.

History 
Decatur Negro High School was the only school for black children in Morgan County, Alabama. It was opened by 1921, and in 1927, a new brick building was built on the highest point on Church Street. Over the years, it was known as George Washington Carver School, Gibbs Street School, East Decatur Colored School and Albany Negro School. After closing due to integration in 1966, the building was used as a storage facility until 1974 when it was reopened as a developmental center. In 1992, the facility became Horizon School, which is still in use . It was placed on the Alabama Register of Landmarks and Heritage in March 2012.

References 

Schools in Morgan County, Alabama
Public high schools in Alabama
Historically segregated African-American schools in Alabama
Properties on the Alabama Register of Landmarks and Heritage
Educational institutions established in 1921
1921 establishments in Alabama
Educational institutions disestablished in 1966
1966 disestablishments in Alabama